Bernard Chambaz (born 18 May 1949 in Boulogne-Billancourt) is a French writer, historian and poet, winner of several French literary prizes.

Selected bibliography 
Poetry
1983: & le plus grand poème par-dessus bord jeté, Seghers
1985: Corpus, Messidor
1987: Vers l'infini milieu des années quatre-vingt, Seghers
1992: Italiques deux, Seghers
1997: Entre-temps, Flammarion
1999: Échoir, Flammarion
2005: Été, Flammarion
2010: Été II, Flammarion

Essais
1987: Le Principe Renaissance, la Sétérée
1989: La Dialectique Véronèse, La Sétérée
1999: Œil noir (Degas), Flohic
2001: Autoportrait sous les arbres, Flohic
2003: La Déposition, with Jean-Pierre Schneider, Le Temps qu'il fait
2006: Ecce Homo (Rembrandt), 
2010: Le vif du sujet, Le Temps qu'il fait
2014: Petite philosophie du vélo, Flammarion
2016: À tombeau ouvert, Stock
Novels
1992: L'Arbre de vies, F. Bourin, ; Points-Seuil, (Prix Goncourt du premier roman)
1995: L'Orgue de Barbarie, Seuil,
1997: La Tristesse du roi, Seuil
1998: Le Pardon aux oiseaux, Seuil
2000: Une fin d'après-midi dans les jardins du zoo, Seuil
2014: Dernières nouvelles du martin-pêcheur, Flammarion
2015: Vladimir Vladimirovitch, Flammarion

Series Mes disparitions 
2005: Kinopanorama, Panama
2007: Yankee, Panama
2010: Ghetto, Seuil
Travel narrations
2003: Petit voyage d'Alma-Ata à Achkhabad, Seuil
2003: À mon tour, Seuil
2007: Evviva l'Italia : ballade, Éditions Panama
2013: Portugal, Bourin Éditeur

Narrations
1994: Martin cet été, Julliard
2011: Plonger, Gallimard 
2012: Caro carissimo Puccini, Gallimard

Other
2004: L'Humanité (1904–2004), Seuil
2006: Des nuages, Seuil
2011: Marathon(s), Seuil

Prizes and honours 
1993: Prix Goncourt du premier roman for L'Arbre de vies, François Bourin, 1992
1994: Prix Paul Vaillant-Couturier for Martin cet été, Julliard
2005: Prix Apollinaire for Eté, Flammarion, 2005
2009: Prix Louis-Guilloux for Yankee (éditions du Panama, 2008) 
2014: Prix Louis-Nucera, Prix Roland de Jouvenel of the Académie française and Grand prix de littérature sportive for Dernières nouvelles du martin-pêcheur (Flammarion)

External links 
 Bernard Chambaz roule en paix on Le Monde
 Bernard Chambaz on Écrivains d'aujourd'hui
 Tombeau pour un fils de roi. Bernard Chambaz a demandé au roman la distance du deuil pour revenir, plus apaisé, sur la disparition de son fils on Libération
 À tombeau ouvert on the site of éditions Stock
 Bernard Chambaz: en route avec Martin on Le Figaro
 Blog

20th-century French male writers
20th-century French historians
21st-century French historians
20th-century French poets
21st-century French poets
21st-century French male writers
Cycling journalists
Prix Goncourt du Premier Roman recipients
Prix Emmanuel Roblès recipients
Prix Louis Guilloux winners
People from Boulogne-Billancourt
1949 births
Living people
French male non-fiction writers
Prix Guillaume Apollinaire winners